Juan Miguel Elorde (born 25 October 1986) is a Filipino boxer. He is the reigning WBO Asia Pacific super bantamweight champion and goes undefeated since he won the championship title in 2015. He is currently ranked no. 4 WBO Super Bantamweight division. He is managed and promoted by his father Johnny Elorde. Currently trained by Toto Laurente of Palompon City, Leyte.

Early years

Mig is the son of Johnny Elorde and grandson of late boxer Gabriel Elorde. He finished a Bachelor of Science degree in Hotel, Restaurant and Institution Management major in Culinary Arts at the De La Salle–College of Saint Benilde in 2008.

His brother Juan Martin Elorde is also a boxer and his other brother Nico Elorde is a professional basketball player in the Philippines playing in the PBA.

Mig and his brothers were introduced to boxing by his father as a way to induce discipline. He started fighting in amateur boxing at age 14. He turned professional boxer after he finished his college studies.

Notable fights

Juan Miguel Elorde vs Tabthong Tor Buamas
Mig defeated former Thailand flyweight champion Tabthong Tor Buamas via unanimous decision to win the  WBO Asia Pacific super bantamweight title. He outpointed the Thai in all rounds with his speed and combination shots to the Thai's body.

Mig is the third Filipino boxer to win the WBO regional title after Jesus Salud (1998) and Genesis Servania (2012).

Professional boxing record

References

1986 births
Living people
Filipino male boxers
Boxers from Metro Manila
Super-bantamweight boxers
People from Parañaque